Richard Lucas may refer to:

Richard Lucas (priest) (1648/9–1715), Welsh Church of England priest and canon
Richard Cockle Lucas (1800–1883), English sculptor
Richard Lucas (politician) (1837–1916), member of the Tasmanian House of Assembly
Richard Lucas (rower) (1886–1968), British rower
Richard Lucas (psychologist), American psychologist and professor
Dick N. Lucas (1920–1997), American film animator
Dick Lucas (minister) (born 1925), British evangelical speaker 
Dick Lucas (American football) (1934–2020), former American football player
Richie Lucas (born 1938), American footballer
Dick Lucas (footballer) (born 1948), former association footballer
Dick Lucas (singer) (born 1961), British vocalist
Dick Lucas, fictional character from Are You Being Served?